Nelly Summeril McKenzie Tolman (1877–1961) was an American painter.

Born in Salisbury, North Carolina, Nelly McKenzie traveled to Washington, D.C. to study at the Corcoran School of Art. Among her instructors there was Ruel Pardee Tolman, whom she would go on to marry. A specialist in miniature painting, she began working in the discipline around 1926, and remained active for many years in local artistic circles. She belonged to the Miniature Painters, Gravers and Sculptors Society of Washington, the Washington Water Color Club, and the Arts Club of Washington, and exhibited regularly with each; she also showed work at the Corcoran Gallery of Art and the Pennsylvania Academy of the Fine Arts and with the American Artists Professional League. She was among those artists included in the Greater Washington Independent Exhibition of 1935. Tolman died in Washington.

A portrait by Tolman, of artist Bertha Jaques, is currently owned by the Smithsonian American Art Museum. A portrait of Elizabeth C. Wickersham is in the collection of the Philadelphia Museum of Art.

References

1877 births
1961 deaths
American women painters
American portrait painters
People from Salisbury, North Carolina
Painters from North Carolina
Painters from Washington, D.C.
Corcoran School of the Arts and Design alumni
Portrait miniaturists
20th-century American painters
20th-century American women artists